Steve Dildine (born February 7, 1984) is a former American football linebacker for the San Francisco 49ers of the National Football League. He was originally signed by the 49ers as an undrafted free agent in 2007. He played college football at Washington State.

External links
San Francisco 49ers bio
Washington State Cougars bio

1984 births
Living people
People from Pierce County, Washington
American football linebackers
Washington State Cougars football players
San Francisco 49ers players